Kurai Ondrum Illai is a 2014 Indian Tamil-language romantic drama film directed by Karthick and starring Geethan and Haritha.

Cast 
Geethan Britto as Krishna 
Haritha Parukod as Sandhya
Shruti Pradeep as Krishna's mother
Vinoth Sagar as Sandhya' father
Vijayalakshmi as Sandhya's mother
Amrutha Srinivasan as Deepika

Production 
This marks the film debut of Jodi Number One fame Geethan Britto and Kana Kaanum Kaalangal fame Haritha Parukod. The film is crowdfunded by sixty different investors and was in the making for three years. The film was shot in the nearby villages of Kanyakumari and Tirunelveli.

Soundtrack 
Music composed by Ramanu (Ramanujan MK) from Musicloudstudio & Technology. This was Ramanu's first Tamil movie & Hriday Goswami arranged the music for the movie. Vijay Sethupathi and Balaji Mohan attended the film's audio launch.
Original Sound Tracks include
 Ellai Ilam Kizhiye  Singers: Saindhavi, Vaisakh Gopi
 Kadhal Mazhyil   Singers:Chinmayi, MM Manasi, MM Monisha
 Killi Killi Pakkam  Singers: Haricharan, Archana Ravi (Manasa Holla)
 Tholaiviniley Singers: Naresh Iyer, Gurupriya
 Kurai Ondrum Illai- Payanam Singers: Nivas
 Kannan Reprise Singers: Vaisakh Gopi

All the songs were mixed & mastered by Hriday Goswami

Reception 
Manigandan K. R. of The Times of India gave the film a rating of three-and-a-half out of five stars and wrote that "A bunch of inexperienced youngsters come together to deliver a film that can so easily be cited as a fine example of responsible filmmaking". Malini Mannath of The New Indian Express opined that "it’s a well-intentioned film, with the director making a sincere effort to strike away from the beaten path".

Box office 
The film did not do well at box office.

References 

Indian romantic drama films
2010s Tamil-language films
2014 films